, literally "religion second generation", is a Japanese phrase which refers to children being raised by their parents with strong religious beliefs. These children may be forced to practice the same religion against their will by their parents. These children are reportedly often challenged by hardships such as child neglect, child abuse, psychology, finance, academy and social independence because of their religious parents and the predatory practices of the religious organization. While the shūkyō nisei is a longstanding social issue in Japan, the Japanese government has been accused of inaction. The assassination of Shinzo Abe in 2022 has increased media scrutiny on the matter.

Overview 
Testimonies from those who are concerned reveal that many of those children suffer from poverty caused by large donations that their parents make to their religious organizations. They also suffer from child neglect due to their parents disappearing for religious activities for several months at a time. Many may be suffering from being forced to accept religious demands. Examples could include prohibitions on watching television, reading manga, attending a friend’s birthday party, physical contact with the opposite gender, visiting temples and shrines of other religions, and participating in other religions’ events, such as Christmas. 

There are cases where their human rights are violated by being prevented from enrolling in higher education or finding employment. Moreover, some are forced to live with bizarre names selected by the founder or forced to drink wine that is said to contain the guru’s blood.

Some shūkyō nisei who want to abandon their faith hesitate in fear of losing their parents' love. In addition, even if they are able to leave the religious organization, they must sever relations with their parents. Therefore, they often struggle when they need a guarantor for employment or relocation of residence, which is a common requirement in Japan. Even if they consult a local government office or hotline regarding child abuse or livelihood support, freedom of religion may be entangled with receiving support, as many of these cases are handled differently from those involving livelihood protection or domestic violence. Some are told that the authorities cannot intervene in religious matters, and that family matters should be discussed within the family first and turned away. There have also been cases in which people requested restrictions on access to residential records of their new addresses in order to escape their parents, but they were denied on the grounds that the issue was one between parent and child.

The perpetrator who fatally shot former Prime Minister Shinzo Abe on July 8, 2022 stated that he targeted Abe for his ties to the Unification Church. The perpetrator's mother joined the Unification Church when he was still a child. His mother later declared bankruptcy after donating most of the family assets to the church while leaving her children unattended and their illness untreated. As a result, matters related to shūkyō nisei have been trending on social media, and members of the Japanese government are urged to take drastic measures. Three months after the assassination, an outspoken shūkyō nisei victim under the pseudonym "Sayuri Ogawa" called for the disbandment of the Unification Church at a press conference, but received messages from her parents via the church accusing her of being mentally unstable and demanding an end to the press conference.

Government responses
In October 2022, Prime Minister Fumio Kishida had ordered his ministers to launch a probe against the UC to decide if the government would request the court to issue an order of removing the UC of its religious corporation status. One focus of this probe was the allegedly illegal child adoption arrangement among the UC followers. The UC denied any organized arrangement. In December 2022, when the Ministry of Health, Labour and Welfare submitted a second inquiry about the child adoption practice, the UC refused to answer more than half of the questions, and sent a letter of protest for the ministry.

In December 2022, the Ministry of Health, Labour and Welfare considered drafting new guidelines which would define what kinds of actions constitute religious abuse against children to better help shūkyō nisei. These include intimidating an individual with language such as "[you will] be damned to hell" (地獄に落ちる) and coercing an individual into participating in any religious activity.

In literature
  (星の子, lit. Child of the Stars) by Natsuko Imamura, a novel published in 2017 and adapted into a movie in 2020
  (「神様」のいる家で育ちました), a manga by  premiered in 2021

In popular culture
The phrase "shūkyō nisei" has entered 2022 top 10 buzzword list in Japan, along with "kokusōgi" (国葬儀) which refers to Shinzo Abe's state funeral. The winning buzzword of 2022 goes to "Murakami-sama" (村神様), nickname of the famed baseball player Munetaka Murakami.

See also 
 Religion in Japan
 Religion and children
 New religious movement
 Cult
 Religious abuse

References 

Wikipedia Student Program
Child abuse in Japan
Religion
Unification Church controversies